Coleophora praecursella is a moth of the family Coleophoridae. It is found in France, Italy and on Sicily.

The larvae feed on the leaves of Pulicaria odora and possibly Cistus species.

References

praecursella
Moths of Europe
Moths described in 1847